Clockwork Radio are an alternative rock band from Wales, now based in Manchester. They have self-released four EPs and have toured extensively around Europe. The band released their debut album No Man Is An Island in September 2014.

History

Beginnings
Clockwork Radio started in north Wales as a side-project of singer and guitarist Rich Williams. This early incarnation of the band released the single "Lost" in November 2007, which was quickly picked up and played by BBC Radio One, BBC Radio Wales and other national radio stations. Two years later Williams teamed up with lead-guitarist Iwan Jones and they relocated to Manchester, England, to concentrate on music and putting a live band together.

The current line-up came together in 2010 when Dan Wiebe, Sam Quinn and Nadim Mirshak joined the band (in 2012 Mirshak left the band, with Quinn taking up on bass). The band began writing new material and started to tour the UK and Europe where they were booked for Taubertal Festival in Germany in August 2010 as a "secret tip".

Tours and releases

To date, the band have done multiple tours across the UK, France, Germany, Belgium, The Netherlands, Luxembourg and Denmark.

So far they have released four EPs exploring various genres including rock, funk and afro-beat, including an all acoustic EP Sketch. All the releases were done via their own label Poly Tune and made available for free download on the band's website. For the artwork and videos the band collaborated with underground artists including Agnes Cecile (Italy) and Juan Carlos Riviera (Spain).

Early reviews include features on the BBC Introducing site stating "Essentially an epic but considered style, their music is effortlessly “large” with Williams’ vocals powerful & melodic" and also a feature on Music-Dash.co.uk giving the band 4.5 out of 5.

Debut album
Clockwork Radio announced details of their debut album due for release in early 2014. The album was recorded live over two days at 80 Hertz Studios in Manchester.

Members
 Rich Williams - Vocals/Guitar
 Dan Wiebe - Vocals/Percussion
 Iwan Jones - Vocals/Guitar  
Sam Quinn - Bass/Keys

Discography

Videography

2011 saw them becoming the first independent band to create a 360-degree interactive music video that is available on their website.

References

External links
 

Welsh rock music groups